Pitchford is a small village in the English county of Shropshire. It is located between Cantlop and Acton Burnell and stands on an affluent of the River Severn. Pitchford takes its name from a bituminous spring/pitch in the village, located near The Row Brook. It is also home to one of the most notable Elizabethan houses in Britain- Pitchford Hall. The Church of St Michael and All Angels stands near to the house which contains a carved oak 13th century effigy of Sir John de Pitchford.
It is also the name for the civil parish.

History

Employment 
In the Census of 1831 a detailed categorisation of employment was recorded, showing that Agricultural Labourers made up the largest sector (over 50%) of employment of Males aged 20 and over in 9 occupational categories. The second largest category consisted of those employed in the Retail and Handicrafts industry. Of the 76 Pitchford population aged between 16 and 74, 59 people were economically active/ employed whereas none were unemployed. The majority (39 people) of these were employed in Service Industries.

Population
Census data during the years 1881– 1961 shows that Pitchford's population decreased while the total population of England and Wales increased conversely. Housing information recorded through the years of 1831–1961 shows the number of houses in the area fluctuated between 35 and 43 houses during this time. Statistics from the 2001 census show that the number of households with residents was 44. In 2001, its total population was 110.

Social Class
Social class was also noted in the 1831 census, showing the majority (over 55%) of the Pitchford population was made up of those described as "Labourers and Servants". The second largest social class was recorded as "muddling sorts".

Pitchford Estate

Pitchford Hall is Grade I listed building and the estate is first referred to in historical records in the Domesday Book (1081–86) as follows:
“Edric, and Leofric and Wulfric held it as thress manors; they were free. 3 hides which pay tax. Land for 5 ploughs. In lordship 3; 3 slaves; 3 ploughmen; 1 village; 3 smallholders, a smith and rider with 2 ploughs. Woodland for fattening 100 pigs. Value before 1066, 8s later 16s; now 40s.”
Records suggest a medieval manor house existed somewhere on the site from at least 1284 to 1431.

The 40-room mansion as it exists today however is said to have been built between 1560 and 1570 for Adam Ottley, a wool merchant from Shrewsbury. The half-timbered mansion stands next to the Church of St Michael and All Angels, and is widely considered to be one of the finest Tudor houses in Britain. The Pitchford estate would remain in the Ottley family until the death of Adam Ottley in 1807, when it passed to Hon. Charles C. C. Jenkinson, second son of the 1st Earl of Liverpool and later to his son-in-law John Cotes.

Princess Victoria – better known as the queen of the same name – visited the hall in 1832, five years before ascending the throne, and wrote in her diary the hall was "A curious looking but very comfortable house. It is striped black and white, and in the shape of a cottage". George VI (The Duke of York at the time) and Duchess of York (The Queen Mother post-1952) also stayed in the hall during 1935. In 1940, during the Second World War, Pitchford Hall was also one of the three houses selected for the King and Queen as a safe refuge.  The hall, unlike some similar properties in Britain has remained in private ownership for many generations. The hall was sold in 1993 however, ending a 500-year family link to the estate. The Pitchford Hall and estate are now separately owned.

Church of St Michael and All Angels
The Church of St Michael and All Angels was founded and built by Ralph de Pitchford in 1220 AD. The Pitchford Estate website describes the church as a “Norman Church with interesting contents". The most notable of which is a solid oak carved tomb effigy (one of only 3 in the country) of a crusader called Sir John De Pitchford.

The church contains separate war memorial plaques, listing two men who died in World War I and three in World War II, as well as a list of nine men and six women of the parish who served in the latter war.

See also
Listed buildings in Pitchford

References

External links

Villages in Shropshire
Civil parishes in Shropshire